Episynlestes cristatus is a species of Australian damselfly in the family Synlestidae,
commonly known as a tropical whitetip. 
It is endemic to north-eastern Queensland, where it inhabits streams in rainforest.

Episynlestes cristatus is a large, very slender damselfly, coloured a dull bronze-black with white markings. It often perches with its wings outspread.

Gallery

See also
 List of Odonata species of Australia

References 

Synlestidae
Odonata of Australia
Insects of Australia
Endemic fauna of Australia
Taxa named by J.A.L. (Tony) Watson
Taxa named by Maxwell Sydney Moulds
Insects described in 1977
Damselflies